Gotland (Gutland in Gutnish), also historically spelled Gottland or Gothland, is Sweden's largest island. It is also a province, county, municipality, and diocese. The province includes the islands of Fårö and Gotska Sandön to the north, as well as the Karlsö Islands (Lilla and Stora) to the west. The population is 61,001, of which about 23,600 live in Visby, the main town. Outside Visby, there are minor settlements and a mainly rural population. The island of Gotland and the other areas of the province of Gotland make up less than one percent of Sweden's total land area. The county formed by the archipelago is the second smallest by area and is the least populated in Sweden.

Gotland is a fully integrated part of Sweden with no particular autonomy, unlike several other offshore island groups in Europe. Historically there was a linguistic difference between the archipelago and the mainland with Gutnish being the native language. In recent centuries, Swedish took over almost entirely and the island is virtually monolingually Swedish in modern times. The archipelago is a very popular domestic tourist destination for mainland Swedes, with the population rising to very high numbers during summers. Among reasons include the sunny climate and the extensive shoreline on mild water. During summer Visby hosts the political event Almedalen Week followed by the Medieval Week, further boosting visitor numbers. In winter, Gotland usually remains surrounded by ice-free water and has mild weather.

Gotland has been inhabited since approximately 7200 BC. The island's main sources of income are agriculture, food processing, tourism, information technology services, design, and some heavy industry such as concrete production from locally mined limestone. From a military standpoint, it occupies a strategic location in the center of the Baltic Sea.

Etymology

The name of Gotland is closely related to that of the Geats and Goths.

History

Prehistoric time to Viking Age 
The island was the home of the Gutes, and sites such as the Ajvide Settlement show that it has been occupied since prehistory. A DNA study conducted on the 5,000-year-old skeletal remains of three Middle Neolithic seal hunters from Gotland showed that they were related to modern-day Finns, while a farmer from Gökhem parish in Västergötland on the mainland was found to be more closely related to modern-day Mediterraneans. This is consistent with the spread of agricultural peoples from the Middle East at about that time.

Gutasaga contains legends of how the island was settled by Þieluar and populated by his descendants. It also tells that a third of the population had to emigrate and settle in southern Europe, a tradition associated with the migration of the Goths, whose name has the same origin as Gutes, the native name of the people of the island. It later tells that the Gutes voluntarily submitted to the king of Sweden and asserts that the submission was based on mutual agreement, and notes the duties and obligations of the Swedish King and Bishop in relationship to Gotland. According to some historians, it is therefore an effort not only to write down the history of Gotland, but also to assert Gotland's independence from Sweden.

It gives Awair Strabain as the name of the man who arranged the mutually beneficial agreement with the king of Sweden; the event would have taken place before the end of the ninth century, when Wulfstan of Hedeby reported that the island was subject to the Swedes:

The number of Arab dirhams discovered on the island of Gotland alone is astoundingly high. In the various hoards located around the island, there are more of these silver coins than at any other site in Western Eurasia. The total sum is almost as great as the number that has been unearthed in the entire Muslim world. These coins moved north through trade between Rus merchants and the Abbasid Caliphate, along the Silver-Fur Road, and the money made by Scandinavian merchants would help northern Europe, especially Viking Scandinavia and the Carolingian Empire, as major commercial centers for the next several centuries.

The Berezan' Runestone, discovered in 1905 in Ukraine, was made by a Varangian (Viking) trader named Grani in memory of his business partner Karl. It is assumed that they were from Gotland.

Notable archaeological findings 

The Mästermyr chest, an important artefact from the Viking Age, was found in Gotland.

On 16July 1999, the world's largest Viking silver treasure, the Spillings Hoard, was found in a field at Spillings farm northwest of Slite. The treasure was found by using a metal detector, and the finders fee, given to the farmer who owned the land, was over 2 million kronor (about US$308,000). The treasure was found almost by accident while filming a news report for TV4 about illegal treasure hunting on Gotland.

Middle Ages 

Early on, Gotland became a commercial center, with the town of Visby the most important Hanseatic city in the Baltic Sea. In late medieval times, the island had twenty district courts (tings), each represented by its elected judge at the island-ting, called landsting. New laws were decided at the landsting, which also took other decisions regarding the island as a whole.

The city of Visby and rest of the island were governed separately, and a civil war caused by conflicts between the German merchants in Visby and the peasants they traded with in the countryside had to be put down by King Magnus III of Sweden in 1288. In 1361, Valdemar Atterdag of Denmark invaded the island. About 1,500 Gotlandic farmers were killed by the Danish invaders after massing for the Battle of Mästerby. The Victual Brothers occupied the island in 1394 to set up a stronghold as a headquarters of their own in Visby. At last, Gotland became a fief of the Teutonic Knights, awarded to them on the condition that they expel the piratical Victual Brothers from their fortified sanctuary. An invading army of Teutonic Knights conquered the island in 1398, destroying Visby and driving the Victual Brothers from Gotland. In 1409, Grand Master Ulrich von Jungingen of the Teutonic Knights guaranteed peace with the Kalmar Union of Scandinavia by selling the island of Gotland to Queen Margaret of Denmark, Norway and Sweden.

The authority of the landsting was successively eroded after the island was occupied by the Teutonic Order, then sold to Eric of Pomerania and after 1449 ruled by Danish governors. In late medieval times, the ting consisted of twelve representatives for the farmers, free-holders or tenants.

Early modern period 

Since the Treaty of Brömsebro in 1645, the island has remained under Swedish rule.

On 19 September 1806, the Swedish government offered the sovereignty of Gotland to the Order of St. John of Jerusalem, who had been expelled from Malta in 1798, but the Order rejected the offer since it would have meant renouncing their claim to Malta. The Order never regained its territory, and eventually it reestablished itself in Rome as the Sovereign Military Order of Malta.

On 22 April 1808, during the Finnish War between Sweden and Russia, a Russian army landed on the southeastern shores of Gotland near Grötlingbo. Under command of Nikolai Andreevich Bodisko 1,800 Russians took the city of Visby without any combat or engagement, and occupied the island. A Swedish naval force rescue expedition was sent from Karlskrona under the command of admiral Rudolf Cederström with 2,000 men; the island was liberated and the Russians capitulated. Russian forces left the island on 18 May 1808.

Administration 
The traditional provinces of Sweden serve no administrative or political purposes today, but are historical and cultural entities. In the case of Gotland, however, due to its insular position, the administrative county (län), Gotland County, and the municipality (kommun), Region Gotland, both cover the same territory as the province. Furthermore, the diocese of Visby is also congruent with the province. Gotland is traditionally divided into 92 sockens. On 1January 2016, they were all reconstituted into Districts, administrative areas with the same borders as the former sockens.

Heraldry 

Gotland was granted its arms in about 1560. The coat of arms is represented with a ducal coronet. Blazon: "Azure a ram statant Argent armed Or holding on a cross-staff of the same a banner Gules bordered and with five tails of the third." The county was granted the same coat of arms in 1936. The municipality, created in 1971, uses the same picture, but with other tinctures.

The Gotlandic flag displays the Gotlandic coat of arms, white on red ground, known from the 13th century in the shape of the seal of the Gutnish Republic with the proud ram. It reads: "Gutenses signo xpistus signatur in agno".

Geography 

Gotland is Sweden's largest island, and it is the largest island fully encompassed by the Baltic Sea (with Denmark's Zealand at the Baltic's edge). With its total area of  the island of Gotland and the other areas of the province of Gotland make up 0.8% of Sweden's total land area. The province includes the small islands of Fårö and Gotska Sandön to the north, as well as the Karlsö Islands, (Lilla and Stora) to the west, which are even smaller. The population is 61,001 as of December 2021. As of 2016, approximately 23,600 people (about 40% of residents) lived in Visby, which is the seat of the municipality and the capital of the county.

Gotland is the name of the main island, but the adjacent islands are generally considered part of Gotland and the Gotlandic culture:
 Furillen
 Fårö
 Gotska Sandön, a National park of Sweden
 The Karlsö Islands (Stora Karlsö and Lilla Karlsö)
 Laus holmar
 Ytterholmen
 Östergarnsholm

There are several shallow lakes located near the shores of the island. The biggest is Lake Bästeträsk, located near Fleringe in the northern part of Gotland. The Hoburg Shoal bird reserve is situated on the southern tip of the island. The average height of the island is 29 meters.

Settlements besides Visby include:

 Burgsvik
 Fårösund
 Hemse
 Klintehamn
 Roma
 Slite
 Tofta
 Vibble

Of these, Hemse is the largest settlement in southern Gotland and along with Roma the two largest inland villages. Burgsvik is the southernmost locality and Fårösund the northernmost. The island of Fårö is permanently settled, but with only a few hundred year-round residents and lacks a permanent fixed link to the main island. Fårö may get connected to the main island with a bridge in the future, but the project has had plenty of delays related to funding.

Slite is the largest settlement on Gotland's sparsely populated east coast.

Climate 
Gotland has a semi-continental variety of a marine climate (Cfb). This results in larger seasonal differences than typical of marine climates in spite of it being surrounded by the Baltic Sea for large distances in all directions. This is due to strong continental winds travelling over the sea from surrounding great landmasses.
Seasonal temperature variation is smaller in more isolated places on the island such as Hoburgen or Östergarnsholm, having warmer autumn and winter, but are cooler during spring and summer days. 
Seasonal lag being exceptionally strong in the weather station Östergarnsholm. As an example, December is warmer than March with temperature lows being similar to April. August is typically the warmest month, an unusual occurrence in Swedish sites. In capital Visby, July and August temperatures tend to be quite even.

Since winters usually remain just above freezing and brackish water remaining liquid longer than freshwater, the sea remains ice-free all year round, except during rare extreme cold waves. The last time the whole passage from the mainland to Gotland froze was in 1987 when icebreakers were used to maintain passenger and goods traffic to the island.

Geology 

Gotland is made up of a sequence of sedimentary rocks of a Silurian age, dipping to the south-east.

It was deposited in a shallow, hot, and salty sea on the edge of an equatorial continent. The water depth never exceeded , and became shallower over time as bioherm detritus and terrestrial sediments filled the basin. Some sandstones are present in the youngest rocks towards the south of the island, which represent sand bars deposited very close to the shoreline.

The lime rocks have been weathered into characteristic karstic rock formations known as rauks. Fossils, mainly of crinoids, rugose corals and brachiopods, are abundant throughout the island; palæo-sea-stacks are preserved in places.

Economy 

The island's main sources of income are agriculture along with food processing, tourism, IT solutions, design and some heavy industry such as concrete production from locally mined limestone. Most of Gotland's economy is based on small scale production.
In 2012, there were over 7,500 registered companies on Gotland. 1,500 of these had more than one employee. Gotland has the world's northernmost established vineyard and winery, located in Hablingbo.

Military 

Gotland occupies a strategic location in the Baltic sea from a defence viewpoint. In March 2015, the Swedish government decided to begin reestablishing a permanent military presence on Gotland, starting with an initial 150 troop garrison, consisting primarily of elements from the Swedish Army. It has been reported that the bulk of this initial garrison will make up a new motorised rifle battalion, alternatively referred to in other reports as a "modular-structured rapid response Army battalion". A later report claimed that plans were at an advanced stage for a support helicopter squadron and an Air Force "fast response Gripen jet squadron" to also be based on the island to support the new garrison and further reinforce the defences. Prior to the disbandment of the original garrison, there had been a continuous Swedish military presence on Gotland in one form or another, for nearly 200 years.

After the standing down of the original garrison, a battalion of the Swedish Home Guard is based on Gotland for emergencies as part of the Eastern Military Region (MR E). The unit, 32:a Gotlandsbataljonen (the 32nd Gotland battalion), acts as a reserve component of the Swedish Amphibious Corps. Among the residual war reserve stocks reported to be still in storage on Gotland in March 2015, were 14 tanks (Stridsvagn 122s) at the Tofta skjutfält (the Tofta firing range), but without any crews or dedicated maintenance personnel assigned to them.

Gotland currently has no local air defence capability. Despite its importance as a naval base in the past, there are no naval units based on Gotland. Another less common name for the range is the Toftasjön firing range. It was a major training and storage facility for the Gotland garrison during its existence, and was still occasionally used for training by various elements of the Armed Forces since the garrison was shut down in 2005. However, from the second half of 2014 onwards, there has been a marked increase in the use of the range, especially by armored units (mostly company sized), as tensions in Northeastern Europe have escalated. At least one of the buildings on the range, the former tank repair shop, is currently owned by a private company (Peab), with the military renting back the top floor for its own use.
As of 2018, Gotland has received a lot more attention military-wise and has seen a much larger spending on the military. As of 2018, the Gotland Regiment has been re-raised and is the first time since World War II that a new regiment has been established in Sweden.

Tourism 

The first modern day tourists came to Gotland during the 19th century and were known as "bathers". Gotland became very popular with socialites at the time through Princess Eugenie who lived in Västerhejde, in the west part of the island from the 1860s.

When a new law ensuring two weeks vacation for all employees in Sweden was passed in 1938, camping became a popular pastime among the Swedes, and in 1955, Gotland was visited by 80,000 people. In the 1970s mostly young people were attracted to Gotland. Since 2010 the island has become a more versatile vacation spot visited by people from all over the world, in all manner of ways.

In 2001, it was the fifth largest tourist destination in Sweden based on the total number of guest nights. Gotland is usually the part of Sweden which receives the most hours of sunlight during a year with Visby statistically the location with the most sunshine in Sweden. In 2007 approximately 750,000 people visited Gotland.

In 1996, for the first time, ferries between Gotland and mainland Sweden carried more than 1 million passengers in a year. In 2007, the number of passengers exceeded 1.5 million. In 2012, the ferries had 1,590,271 passengers and the airlines 327,255 passengers. Even during the COVID-19 pandemic tourism did not change much as Swedes chose to visit the island instead of travelling abroad.

Cruise ships and new pier 

The main port of call on Gotland is Visby. The city is visited by a number of cruise ships every year. About 40 cruise lines frequent the Baltic sea with Visby as one of their destinations. In 2005, 147 ships docked at Visby, in 2010 the number was 69. In 2014, 62 ships are scheduled to visit Visby. The decrease in visiting ships is due to the fact that the modern cruise ships are too large to enter Visby harbor. Ships must anchor a fair distance from shore whereupon passengers are shuttled to shore in small boats, which is not possible during bad weather. In 2007, the first proposition for building a new pier at Visby harbor, large enough to serve the modern cruise ships, was made. In 2011, the matter of the new pier was discussed in the Riksdag and in 2012 research and planning for the pier began. In January 2014, a letter of intent for building a new cruise pier in Visby harbor was signed by Region Gotland and Copenhagen Malmö Port (CMP). The pier is scheduled to be finished in 2018. The estimated cost is 250 million crowns (about US$38.52 million).

Culture 

A number of stones with grooves exist on Gotland. Archaeologists interpret these grooves as traces of an unknown industrial process in the High Middle Ages. There are approximately 3,700 grinding grooves, of which about 750 occur in the solid limestone outcrop and the rest in other rock formations. The latter often consist of hard rocks such as granite or gneiss, but also soft rocks such as sandstone occur. Grinding grooves are also found in Skåne, in southern Sweden and in Finland. Astronomer Göran Henriksson dates a number of these grinding grooves to the Stone Age, from c. 3300 BCE to c. 2000 BCE, based on astronomical alignments, although his methodology has been heavily criticized.

The Medieval town of Visby has been entered as a site of the UNESCO World heritage programme. An impressive feature of Visby is the fortress wall that surrounds the old city, dating from the 13th century.

Many of the residents still speak Gutnish (Gutamål), the autochthonous language on the islands. But most of them now speak Gotlandic, a Gutnish-influenced Swedish dialect. In the 13th century, a work containing the laws of the island, called "the Gotlandic law" (Gutalagen), was published in Old Gutnish, as well as the Gutasaga.

Gotland is noted for its 94 Medieval churches, most of which are restored and in active use. These churches exhibit two major styles of architecture: Romanesque and Gothic. The older churches were constructed in the Romanesque style from 1150 to 1250. The newer churches were constructed in the Gothic architectural style that prevailed from about 1250–1400. The oldest painting inside one of the churches on Gotland stretches as far back in time as the 12th century.

Traditional games of skill like Kubb, Pärk, and Varpa are played on Gotland. They are part of what has become called "Gutniska Lekar", and are performed preferably on the Midsummer's Eve celebration on the island, but also throughout the summer months. The games have widespread renown; some of them are played by people as far away as in the United States.

The knotwork design subsequently named the "Valknut" has the most attested historic instances on picture stones in Gotland, which include being on both the Stora Hammars I and the Tängelgårda stones.
Gotland also has a rich heritage of folklore, including myths about the bysen, Di sma undar jordi, Hoburgsgubben and the Martebo lights.

Gotland gives its name to the traditional farmhouse ale Gotlandsdricka, a turbid beer with much in common with Finnish sahti, and related beers from the Baltic states.

Notable people 

There are a number of notable people born or living on Gotland, or in other major ways associated with the island.

Sport

Events 
 Gotland competes in the biennial Island Games, which it hosted in 1999 and 2017.
 Round Gotland Race-sailing event ("ÅF Offshore Race") starting at Stockholm, around the island of Gotland and back.
  (GGN) is an annual enduro race on Gotland. GGN is a part of the Swedish enduroklassikern (enduro classics, Ränneslättsloppet, Stångebroslaget and Gotland Grand National). GNN is the world's largest enduro race.
 Stånga Games are annual games for Gotlandic sports. The games are held during five days each summer in Stånga. The games are unofficially called "the Gotland Olympic Games". Some of the sports at the Stånga Games are pärk, varpa and caber toss.

Organizations 

In 2012, there were 171 registered sports organizations on Gotland.

Gotland has two senior women's sport teams playing in the first tiers: basketball team Visby Ladies Basket Club (in Basketligan dam) and floorball team Endre IF (in the Swedish Super League). Visby Ladies won the Swedish Championship in 2005.

Football in the province is administered by Gotlands Fotbollförbund. The leading football club is FC Gute, playing in the fourth-tier league Division 2 .

Visby/Roma HK is a hockey club located in Visby, currently playing in group East of Hockeyettan.

In popular culture 
The Long Ships, or Red Orm (original title: Röde Orm), a best-selling Swedish novel written by Frans G. Bengtsson, contains a vivid description of Gotland in the Viking Age. A section of the book is devoted to a Viking ship setting out to Russia, stopping on its way at Gotland and engaging a pilot from the island who plays an important part in their voyage. Gotlanders of the Viking era are depicted as city people, more sophisticated and cosmopolitan than other Scandinavians of their time, and proud of their knowledge and skills.

Naomi Mitchison, in her autobiographic book "You may well ask", relates an experience during a walking tour in Sweden: "Over in Gotland I walked again, further than I would have if I had realized that the milestones were in old Swedish miles, so that my disappointing three-mile walk along the cold sea edge under the strange ancient fortifications was really fifteen English miles [24 km]".

The crime novels of Mari Jungstedt, featuring Detective Superintendent Anders Knutas, are set on Gotland.

In the Battlefield Vietnam video game modification Invasion Gotland, the Soviet Union invades Gotland in 1977.

For the 1989 Studio Ghibli film, Kiki's Delivery Service, by Hayao Miyazaki, he and other illustrators spent time in Gotland in preparation for animation.

Astronomy 

A number of asteroids in the main-belt are named after places on Gotland or Gotlanders, such as 10795 Babben, 3250 Martebo and 7545 Smaklösa. Most of them have been named by Swedish astronomer Claes-Ingvar Lagerkvist, a summer resident on Gotland. All the Gotlandic names are vividly described in NASA's JPL Small-Body Database in connection to each asteroid.

See also 

 Cold War II
 Danes
 Danes (Germanic tribe)
 Geats
 Germanic peoples
 Gothic alphabet
 Gothic language
 Gotland Museum
 Gotland National Conscription
 HVDC Gotland
 Kvenland
 List of church ruins on Gotland
 List of churches on Gotland
 Norsemen
 Old Norse
 Proto-Norse language
 Scandza
 Sweden during World War II
 Sweden proper
 Vavle

References

Further reading 
There are over 8,700 titles about Gotland in the National Library of Sweden online database LIBRIS. About 560 of the books are in English. See: LIBRIS.

External links 

 
 
 Gotland, facts and statistics 2013, pdf, Gotland County. 
 Important years in Gotland' s history  GotslandsResor tourist website 
 Official portal for Gotland County 
 Gotland administrative portal 
 Swedish Radio on Gotland, P4 
 Portal on Gotland with detailed facts about everything on the island 
 Commercial portal on Gotland 
 Official Gotland Tourist Association 
 Famous footprints – traveling on Gotland 
 Portal for eastern Gotland – Östergarnslandet 
 Portal for eastern Gotland – Ljugarn  
 Gotland 
 Interactive map of Gotland 
 A short video (with music) with footage of the Gotland Grand National 2007
 Gotland Grand National (GGN) webpage  (Nordic Sport & Event)

 
Islands of Gotland County
Swedish islands in the Baltic
Ramsar sites in Sweden